The following outline is provided as an overview of and topical guide to Nauru:

Nauru – sovereign island nation located in the Micronesian South Pacific. Its nearest neighbour is Banaba Island in the Republic of Kiribati,  due east. Nauru is the world's smallest island nation, covering just , the smallest independent republic, and the only republican state in the world without an official capital. It is the least populous member of the United Nations.

Initially inhabited by Micronesian and Polynesian peoples, Nauru was annexed and designated a colony by Germany in the late 19th century, and became a mandate territory administered by Australia, New Zealand, and the United Kingdom following World War I. The island was occupied by Japan during World War II, and after the war entered into trusteeship again. Nauru achieved independence in 1968.

Nauru is a phosphate rock island, and its primary economic activity since 1907 has been the export of phosphate mined from the island. With the exhaustion of phosphate reserves, its environment severely degraded by mining, and the trust established to manage the island's wealth significantly reduced in value, the government of Nauru has resorted to unusual measures to obtain income. In the 1990s, Nauru briefly became a tax haven and money laundering centre. Since 2001, it accepted aid from the Australian government; in exchange for this aid, Nauru housed, until early 2008, an offshore detention centre that held and processed asylum seekers trying to enter Australia.

General reference 

 Pronunciation:
 Common English country name:  Nauru
 Official English country name:  The Republic of Nauru
 Common endonym(s): Naoero  
 Official endonym(s): Repubrikin Naoero  
 Adjectival(s): Nauruan
 Demonym(s): Nauruans
 Etymology: Name of Nauru
 ISO country codes:  NR, NRU, 520
 ISO region codes:  See ISO 3166-2:NR
 Internet country code top-level domain:  .nr

Geography of Nauru 

Geography of Nauru
 Nauru is: a country
 Location:
 Southern Hemisphere and Eastern Hemisphere
 Pacific Ocean
 South Pacific
 Oceania
 Micronesia
 Time zone:  UTC+12
 Extreme points of Nauru
 High:  Command Ridge 
 Low:  South Pacific Ocean 0 m
 Land boundaries:  none
 Coastline:  South Pacific Ocean 30 km
 Population of Nauru: 10,000  - 214th most populous country

 Area of Nauru: 21 km2
 Atlas of Nauru
 Nauruan navigational system

Environment of Nauru 

 Climate of Nauru
 Renewable energy in Nauru
 Geology of Nauru
 Protected areas of Nauru
 Biosphere reserves in Nauru
 National parks of Nauru
 Wildlife of Nauru
 Fauna of Nauru
 Birds of Nauru
 Mammals of Nauru

Natural geographic features of Nauru 

 Islands of Nauru: Nauru consists in a single island
 Lakes of Nauru: one: Buada Lagoon
 Mountains of Nauru: none
 Rivers of Nauru: none
 World Heritage Sites in Nauru: none

Regions of Nauru 

Regions of Nauru

Ecoregions of Nauru 

List of ecoregions in Nauru
 Ecoregions in Nauru

Administrative divisions of Nauru 

Administrative divisions of Nauru
 Districts of Nauru

Districts of Nauru 

Districts of Nauru

Municipalities of Nauru 

Municipalities of Nauru
 Capital of Nauru: the Yaren District is the de facto capital of Nauru
 Cities of Nauru

Demography of Nauru 

Demographics of Nauru

Government and politics of Nauru 

Politics of Nauru
 Form of government: parliamentary republic
 Capital of Nauru: Yaren District (de facto only; there is no official capital)
 Elections in Nauru
 Political parties in Nauru: none

Branches of the government of Nauru 

Government of Nauru

Executive branch of the government of Nauru 
 Head of state/Head of government: President of Nauru Sprent Dabwido

Legislative branch of the government of Nauru 
 Parliament of Nauru (unicameral)

Judicial branch of the government of Nauru 

Court system of Nauru
 Supreme Court of Nauru

Foreign relations of Nauru 

Foreign relations of Nauru
 Diplomatic missions in Nauru
 Diplomatic missions of Nauru
 Australia-Nauru relations

International organisation membership 
The Republic of Nauru is a member of:

 African, Caribbean, and Pacific Group of States (ACP)
 Asian Development Bank (ADB)
 Commonwealth of Nations
 Food and Agriculture Organization (FAO)
 International Civil Aviation Organization (ICAO)
 International Criminal Court (ICCt)
 International Criminal Police Organization (Interpol)
 International Olympic Committee (IOC)
 International Telecommunication Union (ITU)

 Organisation for the Prohibition of Chemical Weapons (OPCW)
 Pacific Islands Forum (PIF)
 Secretariat of the Pacific Community (SPC)
 South Pacific Regional Trade and Economic Cooperation Agreement (Sparteca)
 United Nations (UN)
 United Nations Conference on Trade and Development (UNCTAD)
 United Nations Educational, Scientific, and Cultural Organization (UNESCO)
 Universal Postal Union (UPU)
 World Health Organization (WHO)

Law and order in Nauru 

Law of Nauru
 Constitution of Nauru
 Crime in Nauru
 Human rights in Nauru
 LGBT rights in Nauru
 Freedom of religion in Nauru
 Law enforcement in Nauru

Military of Nauru 
Nauru has no regular military forces. Nauru's defence is the responsibility of Australia.

Local government in Nauru 

Local government in Nauru

History of Nauru 

History of Nauru
Timeline of the history of Nauru
Current events of Nauru
 Military history of Nauru
 Japanese occupation of Nauru

Culture of Nauru 

Culture of Nauru
 Architecture of Nauru
 Cuisine of Nauru
 Festivals in Nauru
 Languages of Nauru
 Media in Nauru
 Television in Nauru
 National symbols of Nauru
 Coat of arms of Nauru
 Flag of Nauru
 National anthem of Nauru
 People of Nauru
 Public holidays in Nauru
 Records of Nauru
 Religion in Nauru
 Christianity in Nauru
 Hinduism in Nauru
 Islam in Nauru
 Judaism in Nauru
 Sikhism in Nauru
 World Heritage Sites in Nauru: None

Art in Nauru 
 Art in Nauru
 Cinema of Nauru
 Literature of Nauru
 Music of Nauru
 Theatre in Nauru

Sports in Nauru 

Sports in Nauru
 Football in Nauru
 Nauru at the Olympics

Economy and infrastructure of Nauru 

Economy of Nauru
 Economic rank, by nominal GDP (2007): 189th (one hundred and eighty ninth)
 Agriculture in Nauru
 Banking in Nauru
 National Bank of Nauru
 Communications in Nauru
 Internet in Nauru
 Companies of Nauru
 Currency of Nauru: Dollar
 ISO 4217: AUD
 Energy in Nauru
 Energy policy of Nauru
 Oil industry in Nauru
 Mining in Nauru
 Tourism in Nauru
 Visa policy of Nauru
 Transport in Nauru
 Nauru Stock Exchange

Education in Nauru 

Education in Nauru
Nauru Secondary School
Nauru College

Infrastructure of Nauru
 Health care in Nauru
 Transportation in Nauru
 Airports in Nauru
 Rail transport in Nauru
 Roads in Nauru
 Water supply and sanitation in Nauru

See also 

Nauru
 Index of Nauru-related articles
 List of international rankings
 List of Nauru-related topics
 Member state of the Commonwealth of Nations
 Member state of the United Nations
 Outline of geography
 Outline of Oceania

References

External links 

 Nauru, Permanent Mission to the United Nations
 Asian Development Bank Country Economic Report, Nauru, November 2007
 Our Airline - the former Air Nauru
 Discover Nauru The Official Nauru Tourism Website
 CenPac - The ISP of the Republic of Nauru
 Radio program "This American Life" featured a 30-minute story on Nauru
 
 High resolution aerial views of Nauru on Google Maps
 Nauru country information on globalEDGE

Outlines of countries